Vladimir Vermezović (Serbian Cyrillic: Владимир Вермезовић; born 30 June 1963) is a Serbian football coach and former player.

Playing career
Vermezović (known locally as Vermez or Čika Crni) began playing football for FK Partizan in the Yugoslav First League, before moving abroad to play in Spain for Sporting de Gijón and UD Salamanca. He also played in Greece for Panionios F.C. and finished his playing career with German side Hannover 96.

Managerial career
Following his retirement, Vermezović began coaching with Partizan. He achieved success in reaching the UEFA Cup Round of 16 in the 2004–05 season by coaching sixteen straight matches with Partizan in European competition. This was Partizan's biggest success in the UEFA Cup since the 1988–89 season.

He had a brief spell with Spartak Trnava before joining South African side Kaizer Chiefs in 2009.

In May 2012, he returned to Partizan and once again became head coach. He ended his second spell in charge of Partizan in April 2013.

On 14 February 2014, he was appointed head coach of South African outfit Orlando Pirates. Although he led the team to Nedbank Cup success in May, he left the club later that year, resigning from his position due to a string of poor results in the 2014–15 season.

On 22 November 2020, he was appointed head coach of Emirati side Hatta. However, he would leave the club on May as he failed to keep the club in the league.

Honours
Kaizer Chiefs
 Telkom Cup: 2009–10; 2010–11
 MTN 8 runner-up: 2011–12

Orlando Pirates
 MTN 8 runner-up: 2014–15
 Nedbank Cup: 2013–14

References

External links
 

1963 births
Living people
Footballers from Belgrade
Yugoslav footballers
Serbian footballers
Association football defenders
Yugoslavia international footballers
Serbian football managers
FK Partizan players
Sporting de Gijón players
UD Salamanca players
Panionios F.C. players
Hannover 96 players
Yugoslav First League players
La Liga players
Super League Greece players
2. Bundesliga players
FK Teleoptik managers
FK Partizan managers
FC Spartak Trnava managers
Kaizer Chiefs F.C. managers
Orlando Pirates F.C. managers
FK Budućnost Podgorica managers
Hatta Club managers
UAE Pro League managers
Serbian expatriate footballers
Serbian expatriate sportspeople in Spain
Serbian expatriate sportspeople in Germany
Expatriate footballers in Spain
Expatriate footballers in Greece
Expatriate footballers in Germany
Serbian expatriate sportspeople in South Africa
Expatriate football managers in Slovakia
Expatriate football managers in the United Arab Emirates
Serbian expatriate sportspeople in the United Arab Emirates
Serbian expatriate sportspeople in Slovakia